Streptomyces qinzhouensis is a bacterium species from the genus of Streptomyces which has been isolated from soil from the QinzhouBay in China.

See also 
 List of Streptomyces species

References 

qinzhouensis
Bacteria described in 2020